The 252nd Cyberspace Operations Group is a unit of the Washington Air National Guard at Camp Murray, Tacoma, Washington. It is assigned to the 194th Wing. The 252nd has squadrons at Camp Murray, Joint Base Lewis-McChord and two geographically separated units at Fairchild Air Force Base.

Mission
The 252nd Cyberspace Operations Group provides mobile communication capabilities at home during state emergencies and while deployed around the world.

History
The 252nd Communications Group was activated at Geiger Field in Spokane, Washington, on 1 April 1953. It was redesignated as the 252nd Communications Group (Mobile) in October 1960. In March 1962, the 252nd relocated from Geiger Field to the Four Lakes Communications Station, a former Nike missile site near Cheney, Washington. In June 1971, the 252nd closed operations at Four Lakes and moved to Paine Air National Guard Base in Everett, Washington.

Lineage
 Established as the 252nd Communications Group on 1 April 1953
 Redesignated 252nd Communications Group (Mobile) on 1 October 1960
 Redesignated 252nd Mobile Communications Group on 16 March 1968
 Redesignated 252nd Combat Communications Group on 1 April 1976
 Redesignated 252nd Combat Information Systems Group on 1 July 1985
 Redesignated 252nd Combat Communications Group on 1 October 1986
 Redesignated 252nd Cyberspace Operations Group c. April 2015

Assignments
 Washington Air National Guard, 1 April 1953
194th Regional Support Wing (later 194th Wing), 30 August 2006 – present

 Gaining command
 Air Force Communications Service (later Air Force Communications Command, Air Force Information Systems Command, Air Force Communications Command), 1968-1990
 Tactical Air Command, 1953-1068, 1990-1992
 Air Combat Command, 1992-2009
 Air Force Space Command, 2009-present

Components
 Squadrons
 143rd Communications Squadron (later 143rd Mobile Communications Squadron, 143rd Combat Communications Squadron, 143rd Combat Informations Systems Squadron, 143rd Combat Communications Squadron, 143rd Information Operations Squadron), 16 March 1968 – present
194th Intelligence Squadron
 214th Communications Construction Squadron, 1 April 1953 – 1954
 215th Communications Construction Squadron (later 215th Electronics Installation Squadron, 215th Engineering and Installation Squadron) (at Paine Air National Guard Base), 1 June 1953 – 1 January 1959, 1 May 1970 – by 2012
 221st Mobile Communications Squadron, 15 March 1968 – April 1971
 221st Radio Relay Squadron, 1 January 1963 – 15 March 1968
 222nd Radio Relay Squadron, 1 April 1953 – 1 September 1960
 242nd Mobile Communications Squadron (later 242nd Combat Communications Squadron, 242nd Combat Information Systems Squadron) (at Fairchild Air Force Base), 1 June 1961 – present 
 244th Mobile Communications Squadron (later 244th Combat Communications Flight, 244th Combat Information Systems Squadron, 244th Combat Communications Squadron), 15 March 1968 – 2006
 244th Radio Relay Squadron, 1961 – 15 March 1968
 256th Mobile Communications Squadron (later 256th Combat Communications Squadron, 256th Combat Information /Systems Squadron, 256th Combat Communications Squadron, 256th Intelligence Squadron) (at Fairchild Air Force Base), 19 June 1971 – present
 262nd Communications Squadron (later 262nd Mobile Communications Squadron, 262nd Combat Communications Squadron, 262nd Combat Information Systems Squadron, 262nd Combat Communications Squadron, 262nd Information Warfare Aggressor Squadron, 262nd Network Warfare Squadron, 262nd Cyberspace Operations Squadron 01NOV2017) (at Joint Base Lewis-McChord), 1 April 1953 – present

 Flights
 233rd Mobile Communications Flight (later 233rd Flight Facilities Flight), 1 June 1961 – 7 December 1971
 244th Combat Communications Flight (see 244th Mobile Communications Squadron)

Stations
 Geiger Field, Spokane, Washington, 1953-1962
 Four Lakes Communications Station, Cheney, Washington 1962-1971
 Paine Air National Guard Base, Everett, Washington, 1971-2013
 Camp Murray, Tacoma, Washington, ???-present

Commanders
Colonel Steven Hilsdon (c. 2012)
Colonel Chas Jeffries (2012-2017)
Colonel Kenneth Borchers (2017-2020)
Colonel Robert Siau (2020–present)

Decorations
Air Force Outstanding Unit Award

See also
 List of cyber warfare forces

References

External links

Combat Communications 0252
Military units and formations in Washington (state)
Groups of the United States Air Force